Mulberry Fields is a historic home located at Beauvue, St. Mary's County, Maryland, United States. It was built about 1763, and is a large -story, 5-bay by 2-bay, hip-roofed brick house. On the front is a two-story Doric portico, built about 1820. The house is the only remaining Georgian "mansion-type" home in an area and has a  panoramic view of the Potomac River, with a mile-long allee stretching downhill to the riverbank.

Mulberry Fields was listed on the National Register of Historic Places in 1973.

References

External links
, including undated photo, at Maryland Historical Trust

Houses on the National Register of Historic Places in Maryland
Houses in St. Mary's County, Maryland
Houses completed in 1763
Georgian architecture in Maryland
Historic American Buildings Survey in Maryland
National Register of Historic Places in St. Mary's County, Maryland